Michael Thomas Ford (born October 1, 1968) is an American author of primarily gay-themed literature. He is best known for his "My Queer Life" series of humorous essay collections and for his award-winning novels Last Summer, Looking for It, Full Circle, Changing Tides and What We Remember.

Michael Thomas Ford is the author of more than fifty books for both young readers and adults. He is best known for his best-selling novels Last Summer, Looking for It, and Full Circle and for his five essay collections in the "Trials of My Queer Life" series. His work has been nominated for eleven Lambda Literary Awards, twice winning for Best Humor Book and twice for Best Romance Novel. He was also nominated for a Horror Writers Association Bram Stoker Award (for his novel The Dollhouse That Time Forgot) and a Gaylactic Spectrum Award (for his short story "Night of the Were puss").

Career

1990s
Ford began his writing career in 1992 with the publication of 100 Questions & Answers about AIDS: What You Need to Know Now (Macmillan), one of the first books about the
AIDS crisis for young adults. Named an American Library Association Best Book for Young Adults, the book became the most widely used resource in HIV education programs for young people and was translated into more than a dozen languages.

The follow-up to that book, The Voices of AIDS (William Morrow, 1995), was a collection of interviews with people whose lives have been affected by the AIDS crisis. 

Ford's next book, 1996's The World Out There: Becoming Part of the Lesbian and Gay Community (The New Press), was a handbook for people coming out and wanting to know what it means to be part of the queer world. It earned him his first Lambda Literary Award nomination in the YA category.

1998 saw the release of two books, the first being OutSpoken (William Morrow), a collection of interviews with gay and lesbian people that was again aimed at young adults. Ford's second book to come out that year was Alec Baldwin Doesn't Love Me (Alyson Books), the first of what has come to be known as the "Trials of My Queer Life" series. The book received a Lambda Literary Award for Best Humor book, winning out over titles by lesbian comic Kate Clinton, columnist Dan Savage, and cartoonist Alison Bechdel.

In 1998 he began recording his weekly radio show for the GayBC Radio Network.

2000s
The third in the "Trials of My Queer Life" series, It's Not Mean If It's True (Alyson Books), was published in 2000. It was a bestseller, and Ford was once again nominated for a Lambda Literary Award for best humor book, but did not win.

Also coming out in 2000 were two other projects. The first was an audio recording. My Queer Life (Fluid Words), in which Ford read pieces from his three essay collections. The recording also contained two songs from "Alec Baldwin Doesn't Love Me," a musical project for which Ford wrote the lyrics and performed the narration.

In December 2000 Ford released Paths of Faith: Conversations about Religion and Spirituality (Simon & Schuster). Written for young adults, the book was a collection of interviews with leaders from a range of spiritual traditions and included the last interview given by former Archbishop of New York John Cardinal O'Connor. 

This Queern Life, a stage production written by Ford premiered at the Loring Playhouse in Minneapolis in 2002.

Works 
Adult Novels

 Last Summer (2003), Kensington Books
 Looking For It (2004), Kensington Books
 Full Circle (2006)
 Changing Tides (2007)
 Jane Bites Back (2009), Ballantine
 What We Remember (2009), Kensington Books
 The Road Home (2010), Kensington Books

Novellas and Short Stories

 "Night of the Werepuss" (2002), included in Queer Fear II
 Sting (2003), included in the book Masters of Midnight
 Midnight Thirsts (2004), Kensington Books

Young Adult Novels

 Suicide Notes (2008), HarperCollins

Nonfiction

 100 Questions & Answers about AIDS: What You Need to Know Now (1992), Macmillan
 The Voices of AIDS (1995), William Morrow
 The World Out There: Becoming Part of the Lesbian and Gay Community (1996), The New Press
 OutSpoken (1998), William Morrow
 Paths of Faith: Conversations about Religion and Spirituality (2000), Simon & Schuster
 Ultimate Gay Sex (2004)
 The Path of the Green Man: Gay Men, Wicca, and Living a Magical Life (2005), Citadel Press

Collections and Essays

 Alec Baldwin Doesn't Love Me (1998), Alyson Books
 That's Mr. Faggot to You (1999), Alyson Books
 It's Not Mean If It's True (2000), Alyson Books
 The Little Book of Neuroses (2001)
 My Big, Fat, Queer Life (2003)

Awards 

 The Voices of AIDS (1995): National Science Teachers Association-Children's Book Council Outstanding Science Trade Book for Children; Booklist magazine Editors' Choice
 The World Out There: Becoming Part of the Lesbian and Gay Community (1996): Firecracker Alternative Book Award nomination
 OutSpoken (1998): National Council of Social Studies-Children's Book Council Notable Children's Book in the field of Social Studies; Booklist magazine "Top of the List" selection
 Paths of Faith: Conversations about Religion and Spirituality (2000): Booklist magazine Top 10 Religion Book of the Year; Booklist Editors' Choice "Top of the List" selection for YA Nonfiction; New York Public Library Book for the Teen Age.
 "Night of the Werepuss" (2002), nominated for a Gaylactic Spectrum Award for best short fiction

American Library Association Best Book for Young Adults 

 100 Questions & Answers about AIDS: What You Need to Know Now (won, 1992) 
 The Voices of AIDS (won, 1995)

Lambda Literary Award 

 The World Out There: Becoming Part of the Lesbian and Gay Community (nominated for the Young Adult category,, 1996)
 Alec Baldwin Doesn't Love Me (won Best Humor, 1998)
 OutSpoken (nominated for the Young Adult category, 1998)
 That's Mr. Faggot to You (won Best Humor, 1999)
 It's Not Mean If It's True (nominated for Best Humor, 2000)
 The Little Book of Neuroses (nominated, 2002)
 Masters of Midnight (nominated, 2003)
 My Big, Fat, Queer Life (nominated, 2003)
 What We Remember (won Gay Men's Mystery, 2009)

References

Additional sources 
Day, Frances Ann (2000). Lesbian and Gay Voices: An Annotated Bibliography and Guide to Literature for Children and Young Adults. Greenwood Press. pp. 188–190. . pages 191-193.

External links

 https://www.thecanadianencyclopedia.ca/en/article/mike-ford

 Official site
 Official blog

1968 births
20th-century American novelists
21st-century American novelists
Lambda Literary Award winners
Living people
American gay writers
American Wiccans
American male novelists
LGBT Wiccans
American children's writers
American mystery writers
American LGBT novelists
20th-century American male writers
21st-century American male writers
Wiccan novelists
20th-century pseudonymous writers
21st-century pseudonymous writers